Cyperus remotus is a species of sedge that is native to parts of Africa.

See also 
 List of Cyperus species

References 

remotus
Plants described in 1936
Flora of Sudan
Flora of Zambia
Flora of the Democratic Republic of the Congo
Taxa named by Georg Kükenthal